Reefs Harbour-Shoal Cove West-New Ferolle is a local service district and designated place in the Canadian province of Newfoundland and Labrador. It is southwest of Anchor Point.

Geography 
Reefs Harbour-Shoal Cove West-New Ferolle is in Newfoundland within Subdivision C of Division No. 9. The area consists of three unincorporated communities – Reefs Harbour, Shoal Cove and New Ferolle  – on the New Ferolle Peninsula near Port au Choix.

Demographics 

Government 
Reefs Harbour-Shoal Cove West-New Ferolle is a local service district (LSD) that is governed by a committee responsible for the provision of certain services to the community. The chair of the LSD committee is Gloria Tucker.

See also 
List of communities in Newfoundland and Labrador
List of designated places in Newfoundland and Labrador
List of lighthouses in Canada
List of local service districts in Newfoundland and Labrador

References

External links 
 Aids to Navigation Canadian Coast Guard

Populated coastal places in Canada
Designated places in Newfoundland and Labrador
Lighthouses in Newfoundland and Labrador
Local service districts in Newfoundland and Labrador